Missy Bo Kearns (born 14 April 2001) is an English professional footballer who plays a midfielder for Women's Super League club Liverpool and had represented the England national team at youth level.

Early life 
Kearns was born in 14 April 2001 in Liverpool, England. She grew up supporting Liverpool and regularly attended their matchday. She joined Liverpool's youth academy when she was eight years old after being scouted as the only girl playing in the local grassroots team Mossley Hill, alongside future Liverpool player Curtis Jones

Club career
Kearns made her first team debut for Liverpool in March 2019 against Chelsea. She signed her first professional contract with the club on January 2020 and joined Blackburn Rovers on loan until the end of the 2019–20 season She saw significant increased in game time during the 2020–21 season and established herself as a first team regular for Liverpool towards the second-half of the season. On 17 January 2021, she scored her first senior goal for the club in a 2–1 league lost against Leicester City. In October 2021, at the age of 20, she became the youngest player to ever captain the side. She won the Standard Chartered Women's Player of the Season and was voted the fan's player of the year at the end of the 2020–21 season.

Career statistics

Club

Honours
Liverpool
FA Women's Championship: 2021–22

References

External links
 
 

Liverpool F.C. Women players
2001 births
Women's Super League players
Footballers from Liverpool
Women's association football midfielders
English women's footballers
Living people
England women's youth international footballers
People educated at King David High School, Liverpool